Agave angustifolia (Caribbean agave) is a type of agave plant which is native to Mexico and Central America. It is used to make mezcal and also as an ornamental plant, the cultivar 'Marginata' that white margins on the leaves is a popular variety cultivated in botanical gardens and backyards. It is very closely related to blue agave Agave tequilana, but is used to make the distilled alcoholic beverage mezcal instead of tequila and is the predominant agave species grown in the State of Oaxaca.

The World Checklist of Selected Plant Families regards Agave angustifolia as an accepted name. 

Other sources maintain them as distinct species with non-overlapping native distributions (García-Mendoza and Fernando Chiang 2003). A. angustifolia has narrow, stiffly erect leaves with moderately-spaced spines, producing capsules, not bulbiferous; whereas A. vivipara is described as having shorter, recurved leaves with short-spaced spines and bulbiferous. A. vivipara is likely similar to A. karatto. The A. vivipara of Miller (1768) and Smith et al. (2008) seem different, of a much smaller habit and narrower leaves, from the A. vivipara of Trelease (1913) and García-Mendoza and Fernando Chiang (2003), of a much larger habit.

References

External links
Hort.ifas.ufl.edu: Agave angustifolia

angustifolia
Flora of Central America
Flora of Central Mexico
Flora of Northeastern Mexico
Flora of Northwestern Mexico
Garden plants of North America
Drought-tolerant plants
Plants described in 1812